James F. Malone, Jr. (1904 – August 29, 1976) was the District Attorney for Allegheny County, Pennsylvania from January 1952 until January 3, 1956.  He was a member of the Republican Party and was a member of Pittsburgh City Council in the 1920s and its president in 1928. Malone was the longtime president of the Pennsylvania Manufacturers Association after he retired from his District Attorney Duties.    He won election on November 6, 1951 defeating Democratic Judge Francis J. O'Connor.

See also

 District Attorney
 Pittsburgh Police
 Allegheny County Sheriff
 Allegheny County Police Department

References

Lawyers from Pittsburgh
Politicians from Pittsburgh
Pittsburgh City Council members
County district attorneys in Pennsylvania
1904 births
1976 deaths
Pennsylvania Republicans
20th-century American lawyers
20th-century American politicians